Walter Carroll (4 July 1869 - 9 October 1955) was an English composer, music lecturer, education lecturer and author.

This is a list of his compositions and writings (with publishers in brackets).

Piano music 

1892 - Piano Sonata in C minor (Forsyth)

1892 - Two Sonatinas in C and D major (Forsyth)

Choral music 

1893 - When Jesus Christ Our Lord Was Born (Curwen)

1899 - Single Chant in C (Bristol Tune Book)

1901 - Fallowfield (Hymn tune) (Sheffield Sunday School Union)

1902 - Magnificat and Nunc Dimittis in F (Weekes)

1902 - Benedicite Omnia Opera or The Song of the Three Holy Children (Weekes)

1903 - Chorale - Sleep Thy Last Sleep (Weekes)

1923 - Anthem - Sleep Thy Last Sleep (Forsyth)

The Stars (four-part song)

Nature (Sonnet for five voices)

Orchestral music

c1900 - Festive Overture

Seascape: A Children's Suite, orchestrated by Eric Fogg.

Educational piano music for children 

1908 - First Lessons in Bach, Book 1 (Forsyth)

1909 - First Lessons in Bach, Book 2 (Forsyth)

1912 - First Piano Lessons, Book 1: Scenes at a Farm (Forsyth)

1913 - First Piano Lessons, Book 2: The Countryside (Forsyth)

1914 - Sea Idylls (Forsyth)

1914 - Six Easy Studies in Olden Style (Forsyth)

1916 - Forest Fantasies (Forsyth)

1919 - First Piano Lessons, Book 1a: Tunes from Nature (Forsyth)

1922 - In Southern Seas (Forsyth)

1923 - Twelve Studies (Forsyth)

1923 - Water Sprites (Forsyth)

1933 - River and Rainbow (Forsyth)

1937 - Four Gypsies (Ricordi)

1946 - The Enchanted Isle for Violin and Piano (Forsyth)

1953 - Four Country Dances (Forsyth)

1973 - The Lonely Shepherd (op. posth.) (Forsyth)

Educational books, pamphlets and papers 

1894 - Advice to Students Preparing for Examination in the Theory of Music (Heywood)

1904 - The Study of Music (Sherratt and Hughes)

1906 - Notes on Musical Form (Sherratt and Hughes)

1906 - The Teaching of Music (Sherratt and Hughes)

1907 - The Training of Music Teachers (no publisher given)

1912 - Notes on First Piano Lessons (Forsyth)

1914 - The Unfolding of Personality (Sherratt and Hughes)

1919 - One Hundred and Fifty Melodies for the Use of Elementary Harmony and Singing Students (Forsyth)

1922 - The Training of Children's Voices (Forsyth)

1925 - Handbook of Music (Manchester Education Committee) (Reprinted 1927; 1934)

1930 - Music in Manchester Schools (Manchester Education Committee)

1942 - The Unfolding of Personality (A Grayson, Manchester)

1948 - Music in Life and Education (Williams)

1951 - The True Story of "Scenes at a Farm" (Forsyth)

undated - Children's Voices: The Fourteen Points of Voice Training (Forsyth)

References

Carroll, Walter